Acrossocheilus xamensis is a species of ray-finned fish in the genus Acrossocheilus, it is endemic to the Nam Xam river in Laos.

References

Xamensis
Fish described in 2000